is a Japanese actor, musician and fashion model. This comes from his grandfather on his father's side, who gave him a Japanese name because he did not like his given name. He is half-Okinawan and half-Chilean. He was brought up in Yokohama, Kanagawa Prefecture, Japan since he was 6. He also has two siblings,a younger brother nicked named Rocky and a younger sister Mari. Though he was born in Argentina, he does not speak any Spanish, since his formal education was all done in Japan. Japanese is the only language he is able to write and speak. Later during his teenage years his parents separated. That was due to his mother's infidelity. He never graduated high schoolm due to low grades, but showed interest in the arts.

His favorite hobbies are playing soccer, billiards, snowboarding and skateboarding. Special abilities of his include making cocktails and playing instruments such as the trumpet, guitar and the piano.

His musical activities started when he was in junior high school where he joined his first band, The Lantern. The band was formed in 2001, but disbanded in 2003. In 2004, he started a new band, "Daniel Control", where he is the lead vocalist, and also plays the guitar and piano. "Daniel Control" has also won a musical competition.

Appearances

TV programs 
 The Street Fighters at TV Asahi — there he had got the first place in the national popularity ranking for four weeks

Stage

Magazines 
 CHECK MATE
 Smart
 MEN'S POPOLO

Other appearances 
 Regular appearances in the Internet broadcasting show .
  and 
 Regular appearances at the last Sunday of each month in a live event

External links 
 Official Blog 
 ShibutamaTV!Net 
 Night's net studio 
 Official TeniMyu Homepage 

1982 births
Living people
Argentine people of Japanese descent
Argentine people of Chilean descent
Japanese male actors
People from Yokohama
Musicians from Kanagawa Prefecture
21st-century Japanese male singers
21st-century Japanese singers